Nina Floy Bracelin was a botanist, plant collector, and scientific illustrator.

A fuchsia, Fuchsia bracelinae, is named after her. A willow, Salix lesiolepis bracelinae, is named after her. She was given a lifetime membership to the California Academy of Sciences.

She worked extensively with Ynes Mexia and with Alice Eastwood.

References

External links 

 Transcript of oral history interview with Nina Floy Bracelin, 1965 and 1967. The Bancroft Library

1890 births
1973 deaths
American women botanists
American botanists
University of California, Berkeley alumni
20th-century American women